Zmago Sagadin (born 1 November 1952 in Celje) is widely considered as the most successful Slovenian and top European basketball coach with 25 championship titles both on a national and international level, recognized 9 times as Slovenian Top Coach of the Year and recipient of many other honorary awards.

Zmago is known for his outstanding work with young players, which resulted in 11 of his players to move on to compete in NBA – developing more NBA players than any other coach in Europe – and helped numerous others to achieve the highest European level.

Zmago last worked as head coach of MZT Skopje in 2014/2015 season, but has been active as a sports commentator, basketball strategy consultant and mentor. From 2011 to 2014, Sagadin was head of staff at KK Helios Domžale, where he formed a center for development of young basketball talents, including Klemen Prepelič, Gregor Hrovat, Blaž Mahkovic and Matic Rebec.

Sagadin is known for his development of players who compete internationally and in NBA. Success of Union Olimpija Ljubljana (formerly Smelt Olimpija), during his time coaching the team, contributed to establishing basketball as part of Slovenian sport culture and recognition of Union Olimpija as a reputable European club.

Zmago is also the founder of Slovenia's first national basketball team and co-founder of the Adriatic Basketball League, author of basketball-related articles, served eight years as a President of Slovenian Basketball Coaches Association, and lectures for KZS, FIBA and ULEB-organized seminars and clinics.

Career achievements

Club Titles
 FIBA European Cup winner: 1 (with Olimpija: 1993–94)
 Adriatic League champion: 1 (with Olimpija: 2001–02)
 Slovenian League champion: 10 (with Olimpija: 1991–92, 1992–93, 1993–94, 1994–95, 1996–97, 1997–98, 1998–99, 2000–01, 2001–02, 2005–06)
 Slovenian Cup winner: 11 (with Olimpija: 1991–92, 1992–93, 1993–94, 1994–95, 1996–97, 1997–98, 1998–99, 1999–00, 2000–01, 2001–02, 2005–06) 
 Serbia & Montenegro Cup winner: 1 (with Crvena zvezda: 2003–04)

and

 Euroleague Final Four – 3rd place with Olimpija: 1996–97

Awards
Slovenian Coach of the Year – 1992/93, 1993/94, 1994/95, 1996/97, 1997/98, 1998/99, 1999/00, 2000/01, 2001/02

Players
He developed many great basketball players: Beno Udrih, Primož Brezec, Boštjan Nachbar, Šarūnas Jasikevičius, Jiří Welsch, Marko Milič, Vladimir Stepania, Soumaila Samake, Radisav Ćurčić (former NBA), Vladimir Boisa, Sani Bečirovič, Nikola Vujčić, Vlado Ilievski, Gregor Fučka, Jurica Golemac, Ariel McDonald, Marko Tušek, Boris Gorenc, Jasmin Hukić, Ivica Jurković, Gregor Hafner, Klemen Prepelič.

He helped the career of Igor Rakočević, Scoonie Penn, Obinna Ekezie, Mindaugas Žukauskas, Sandro Nicević, Yotam Halperin.

Coaches
Sagadin served as a mentor to many of his former assistant coaches and players who are now head coaches:
 Sašo Filipovski (CSKA Moscow, Lottomatica Roma, Turow Zgorzelec, Union Olimpija),
 Tomo Mahorič (BC Kyiv, Slask Wrocław, Lietuvos Rytas, Union Olimpija),
 Neven Spahija (Tau Ceramica, Maccabi Tel Aviv, Lietuvos rytas),
 Aleksandar Trifunović, (Lietuvos rytas, Crvena zvezda),
 Zoran Martič (Union Olimpija, Domžale, Slovan, Pivovarna Laško),
 Jure Zdovc (Union Olimpija, Bosna, Split, Iraklis, Panionios).

See also 
 List of Radivoj Korać Cup-winning head coaches

About
 Euroleague.net coach profile: Zmago Sagadin
 Eurobasket.com Zmago Sagadin profile
 Union Olimpija history

Interviews
 Polet: "Prva peterka bo slovenska!"
 Adriatic League interview: Zmago Sagadin
 MojeDelo interview: Zmago Sagadin

References

External links
 FIBA Assist Magazine: Zmago Sagadin – Defense Is a Constant
 Zmago Sagadin, Jasmin Hukić's coach
 Lietuvos Rytas: Drucker out, Sagadin in

1952 births
Living people
ABA League-winning coaches
Sportspeople from Celje
Slovenian basketball coaches
BC Rytas coaches
KK Crvena zvezda assistant coaches
KK Crvena zvezda head coaches
KK Olimpija coaches
KK Zadar coaches
Slovenia national basketball team coaches
Slovenian expatriate basketball people in Serbia
KK Helios Domžale coaches